Alfred Beck (12 April 1925 – September 1994) was a German footballer who played as a forward.

Club career
Beck began his career at Bremer SV. He went on to play for FC St. Pauli and Wuppertaler SV before finishing his career with FC Zürich.

International career
Beck played just once for West Germany in a friendly against England in December 1954. West Germany lost the match 3-1, with Beck scoring the team's only goal.

Managerial career
After retiring from playing, Beck moved into management. He spent his entire managerial career in Switzerland, mostly in charge of clubs in the Swiss second division.

References

External links

1925 births
1994 deaths
People from Wartburgkreis
German footballers
Association football forwards
Footballers from Thuringia
Germany international footballers
Bremer SV players
FC St. Pauli players
FC Zürich players
FC Aarau managers
FC Thun managers
German football managers
German expatriate footballers
German expatriate sportspeople in Switzerland
Expatriate footballers in Switzerland